{
  "type": "FeatureCollection",
  "features": [
    {
      "type": "Feature",
      "properties": {},
      "geometry": {
        "type": "Point",
        "coordinates": [
          16.507927961647514,
          45.29307394247361
        ]
      }
    }
  ]
}

Veliko Krčevo is a village in Sisak-Moslavina County, Croatia, 19,6 km north from Hrvatska Kostajnica, a historic city on the river Una.

Demographics 

According to the 2011 census, there are 97 inhabitants and 38 households. 

Its elevation is 130 m.

The chief occupation is farming. 

Populated places in Sisak-Moslavina County